Fominsky is a rural locality (a khutor) in Novonikolayevskoye Rural Settlement, Novonikolayevsky District, Volgograd Oblast, Russia. The population was 152 as of 2010. There are 3 streets.

Geography 
Fominsky is located in steppe, on the Khopyorsko-Buzulukskaya Plain, 10 km northwest of Novonikolayevsky (the district's administrative centre) by road. Korolevsky is the nearest rural locality.

References 

Rural localities in Novonikolayevsky District